Agonopterix anticella is a moth in the family Depressariidae. It was described by Nikolay Grigoryevich Erschoff in 1877. It is found in Irkutsk Oblast, Russia.

References

Moths described in 1877
Agonopterix
Moths of Asia